"Le Chemin" is a 2002 song recorded by French band Kyo in duet with Dutch pop singer Sita. It was the first single from the album Le Chemin on which it appears as the first track, and was later notably included on Kyo's 2004 compilation Best of and on NRJ Music Awards 2003. Written and composed by Kyo, the single was released in November 2002 and achieved some success.

Critical reception
The song achieved success in France, where it reached number 12 on 4 January 2003 and totaled 27 weeks on the chart (top 100). It peaked at number four on 15 February 2003 on the Ultratop 50 (Belgian Walloon chart) and remained for 22 weeks in the top 40, five of them in the top ten. In Switzerland, it hit a mixed success, reaching number 14 for two weeks and totalling 24 weeks in the top 100.

In 2004, the song was awarded 'Francophone Song of the Year' at the NRJ Music Awards.

Track listings
 CD single

 Digital download (since 2005)

Charts and sales

Peak positions

Year-end charts

Certifications and sales

References

2002 songs
2003 debut singles
Kyo (band) songs
Male–female vocal duets